Gilbert Noël (26 September 1926 – 17 March 1999) was a French politician.

Gilbert Noël was born in Paris on 26 September 1926. He trained as a veterinarian and worked as an inspector in slaughterhouses. He served as mayor of Saint-Maur-des-Fossés from 1959 until his 1977 defeat by Jean-Louis Beaumont. Noël sat in the National Assembly representing Paris from 9 February 1966 to 2 April 1967, and Val-de-Marne from 8 May 1967 to 30 May 1968. While representing Paris, he was affiliated with Union for the New Republic. Upon its dissolution and assuming the Val-de-Marne seat, Noël switched to the Union of Democrats for the Republic. He was a chevalier of the ordre national du Mérite. Noël died at home in Saint-Maur-des-Fossés on 17 March 1999.

References

1926 births
1999 deaths
Deputies of the 2nd National Assembly of the French Fifth Republic
Deputies of the 3rd National Assembly of the French Fifth Republic
Mayors of places in Île-de-France
Knights of the Ordre national du Mérite
French veterinarians
Politicians from Paris
Union of Democrats for the Republic politicians
Union for the New Republic politicians